Sulemanu Tetteh (born 18 August 1992) is a Ghanaian boxer. He competed in the Men's light flyweight division in the boxing at the 2012 Summer Olympics, losing in the first round to Jantony Ortíz of Puerto Rico. Commenting on the bout, he said, "I have experienced something from a champion". Earlier in 2012, he won the gold medal in the light flyweight division at the ECOWAS games.

He qualified to represent Ghana at the 2020 Summer Olympics.

See also
 Ghana at the 2012 Summer Olympics

References

External links
 
 
 
 

1992 births
Living people
Ghanaian male boxers
Olympic boxers of Ghana
Boxers at the 2012 Summer Olympics
Boxers at the 2014 Commonwealth Games
Commonwealth Games competitors for Ghana
Competitors at the 2019 African Games
Light-flyweight boxers
Boxers from Accra
African Games competitors for Ghana
Boxers at the 2020 Summer Olympics